Leila Agnes Buissinné Reitz, (née Wright ; 13 December 1887 – 27 December 1959) was a South African politician who served as the first woman elected to Parliament in South Africa. She represented Parktown in the House of Assembly of South Africa from 1933 until 1943.

Following the passage of the Women's Enfranchisement Act, 1930 which granted white women aged over 21 the right to vote Reitz contested the 1933 South African general election and was elected to represent Parktown. During her parliamentary career Reitz served as a member of the Interdepartmental Committee on Destitute, Neglected, Maladjusted and Delinquent Children and Young Persons and as Honorary Vice-President of the National Conference on Social Work.

She left politics in 1943 to accompany her husband, Deneys Reitz, to London after he was appointed South African High Commissioner to the United Kingdom. She retired to Cape Town and died in 1959 aged 72.

References

1887 births
1959 deaths
Alumni of Rustenburg School for Girls
Members of the House of Assembly (South Africa)
South African expatriates in the United Kingdom
South African Party (Union of South Africa) politicians
South African women in politics
White South African people